The Milton Keynes Breakers are a basketball club based in the city of Milton Keynes, England. The club was founded in 2017, adding the Breakers name in 2022, after the famous Bletchley Codebreakers.

The senior men's team entered the National Basketball League in 2022, marking the return of basketball to the city of Milton Keynes for the first time since the Milton Keynes Lions, who played in the British Basketball League from 1998 to 2012, moved to London.

Season-by-season records

References

Basketball teams in England
Sport in England